The Mokhotlong River is a river in northeastern Lesotho. 

It arises as a confluence of several intermittent mountain streams near the South African border, then flows northwest to a confluence from the Sanqebethu River, then westward to its confluence into the Senqu River at the town of Mokhotlong.

Location

References

Rivers of Lesotho